Basma Alawee is an Iraq-born, Florida-based activist on refugee issues.

She fled, with her family, from Baghdad to Florida in 2010 after threats on their lives. In USA she co-founded WeaveTales and helped set up the Iraqi Family Organization.

She won an Eve award in 2020.

Early life 

Alawee was born in Baghdad, during the Iran-Iraq War, where she studied engineering.

Move to USA 
After her husband took a job with a US-run organization, their lives were threatened. In 2010, Alawee and her husband moved as refugees to Jacksonville, Florida.

Career 
While in Iraq, Alawee worked at the national Department of Oil.

Upon arrival in USA at first volunteered at Lutheran Social Services, at World Relief and other Catholic Charities doing interpretation and other refugee-support work. Later, she was hired by Alden Road Exceptional Student Center as a teacher before moving to The Foundation Academy to teach science and mathematics.

In 2013 Alawee became the Florida delegate for the Refugee Congress.

In 2018 she became the inaugural Organizer for the Florida Immigrant Coalition. In 2019, she co-founded for not-for-profit WeaveTales and was a key part of the founding of the Iraqi Family Organization, an entity that helps Arabs teach each other.

She currently works as the national campaign manager for campaign organization We Are All America.

In 2021 she campaigned for Americans to welcome Afghan refugees. And invited others to organize support for refugees.

In 2020 she won an EVE award.

Family 
Alawee's husband is Ali Aljubouri, and they have two daughters, Dana, and Rodina.

References

External link 
We Are All America, official website
WeaveTales, official website

Year of birth missing (living people)
Living people
Iraqi emigrants to the United States
American engineers
Iraqi engineers
Iraqi refugees
People from Baghdad